Hydrobiologia, The International Journal of Aquatic Sciences, is a peer-reviewed scientific journal publishing 21 issues per year, for a total of well over 4000 pages per year. Hydrobiologia publishes original research, reviews and opinions investigating the biology of freshwater and marine habitats, including the impact of human activities. Coverage includes molecular-, organism-, community -and ecosystem-level studies dealing with biological research in limnology and oceanography, including systematics and aquatic ecology. In addition to hypothesis-driven experimental research, it presents theoretical papers relevant to a broad hydrobiological audience, and collections of papers in special issues covering focused topics.

History
Hydrobiologia changed on the appointment of Henri Dumont to be its editor-in-chief. He introduced peer review, and expanded production from 6 issues per year to more than 20 per year.
Koen Martens took over the responsibility as editor-in-chief in 2003, with the aim of increasing the relevance and impact of the journal to a broader readership. In 2015, due to the increase in the number of submissions, three associate editors-in-chief started helping him to manage a group of about 45 academic editors.

Abstracting and indexing 
The journal is indexed by Web of Science, Scopus, PubMed, Scimago, and several other indexes.

Notable articles 
The three most highly cited papers in Hydrobiologia, with more than 600 citations, are:

Søndergaard, M., Jensen, J. P., & Jeppesen, E. 
ter Braak, C. J., & Juggins, S. 
Qin, B., Xu, P., Wu, Q., Luo, L., & Zhang, Y.

References

Biology journals
Springer Science+Business Media academic journals